The 1984 United States Senate election in Tennessee took place on November 6, 1984, as a part of the Senate class 2 election.

Background

Popular three-term Republican incumbent Howard Baker, who had served as United States Senate Majority Leader since 1981 (Minority Leader from 1977 to 1981) decided not to seek re-election in order to concentrate on a planned bid for 1988 Republican presidential nomination (which did not happen, as he later accepted a White House Chief of Staff position under President Ronald Reagan). This made the seat open.

Democratic nomination

Democrats nominated Representative and future Vice President of the United States Al Gore, whose father, Albert Gore, Sr., had once held Tennessee's other Senate seat.

Democratic

Republican primary

Candidates:
  State Senator Victor Ashe
  Jack McNeil
  Hubert David Patty

In the primary, held on August 2, Ashe easily emerged as a winner:

  Ashe - 145,744 (86.47%)
  McNeil - 17,970 (10.66%)
  Patty - 4,777 (2.83%)
  Write-in - 49 (0.03%)

General election

Although the Senate election coincided with the landslide re-election of President Reagan, who carried Tennessee by a wide margin, this time his victory did not have any coattails, as it did in 1980, and Democrats picked up three Republican seats. One of the Democratic gains was in Tennessee, where conservative Democrat Gore won in a landslide:

See also 
  1984 United States Senate elections

References

1984
Tennessee
United States Senate
Al Gore